The International Amateur Pair Go Championship (IAPGC as known as IAPG CUP) is an international tournament for amateur Go players under the Pair Go rule, held once a year since 1990. This competition is partly on the international championship and partly on the Japanese national championship.
The organising body is the Japan Pair Go Association (JPGA) and the International Amateur Pair Go Championship Executive Committee.

History
Hisao Taki, the president of NKB inc. in traffic advertisement Industry, originated Pair Go and promoted first pair go championship named International Go Amateur Pair Tournament as known as the NKB Cup on December 23, 1990. However, this event is officially translated as 1st International Amateur Pair Go Championship in English. 64 players from 4 countries were invited in this event.

On November 24, 1991, 2nd International Amateur Pair Go Championship was held at Hotel Edmont in Tokyo. Since this event, the neme  of event was fixed.

In 2008, Pair Go was one of the official sports in World Mind Sports Games. For this reason, 19th event was promoted in 2008 World Mind Sports Games.

In March 2010, "Pair Go 20th Anniversary WPGA Pair Go World Cup 2010 Hangzhou" was held in Hangzhou, China.

Past champions

See also
 Go competitions
 Go players
 Rengo

References

External links
World Pair Go Association
23rd International Amateur Pair Go Championship

International Go competitions
Go competitions in Japan